The 2006–07 season was PAOK Football Club’s 81st in existence and the club’s 48th consecutive season in the top flight of Greek football. The team will enter the Greek Football Cup in the Fourth round. PAOK will not be entitled to take part in the 2006–07 UEFA Cup. UEFA has confirmed to the Hellenic Football Federation that it is not in a position to admit PAOK to the competition as the club did not have a fixed licence by the deadline of the end of May 2006.

Players

Squad

Transfers

Players transferred in

Players transferred out

Kit

Friendlies

Competitions

Overview

Managerial statistics

Super League Greece

League table

Results summary

Results by round

Matches

Greek Cup

Fourth round

Fifth round

Quarter-finals

Statistics

Squad statistics

! colspan="13" style="background:#DCDCDC; text-align:center" | Goalkeepers
|-

! colspan="13" style="background:#DCDCDC; text-align:center" | Defenders
|-

! colspan="13" style="background:#DCDCDC; text-align:center" | Midfielders
|-

! colspan="13" style="background:#DCDCDC; text-align:center" | Forwards
|-

|}

Goalscorers

Disciplinary record

References

External links
 PAOK FC official website

PAOK FC seasons
PAOK